RC Racer (known as Rex's Racer in Shanghai) is a steel shuttle roller coaster operating at Walt Disney Studios Park in France, Hong Kong Disneyland, and Shanghai Disneyland. Manufactured by Intamin, the ride is part of the Toy Story Playland in France, Toy Story Land in Hong Kong, and Toy Story Land in Shanghai. The ride in France opened on August 17, 2010, while the Hong Kong installation opened on November 17, 2011, and the Shanghai ride opened on April 26, 2018. This is the second roller coaster in Hong Kong Disneyland and Shanghai Disneyland, and the third roller coaster in Walt Disney Studios Park.

Attraction
This ride is located at the back of Toy Story Playland, amongst mature trees, which double as overgrown bushes in the Toy Story universe. The ride vehicle is themed to the RC toy character from the film series, while the track is themed to an orange racetrack playset.

See also
 Hong Kong Disneyland attraction and entertainment history
 2011 in amusement parks

References

External links
 RC Racer at Walt Disney Studios Park (official webpage)
 RC Racer at Hong Kong Disneyland (official webpage)
 Rex's Racer at Shanghai Disneyland (official webpage)

Toy Story
Walt Disney Studios Park
Hong Kong Disneyland
Shanghai Disneyland
Toy Story Land
Pixar in amusement parks
Roller coasters at Walt Disney Studios Park
Roller coasters introduced in 2010
Roller coasters introduced in 2011
Roller coasters at Hong Kong Disneyland
Roller coasters introduced in 2018
2010 establishments in France
2011 establishments in Hong Kong
2018 establishments in China